Labdia faceta is a moth in the family Cosmopterigidae. It was described by Edward Meyrick in 1912. It is known from India and Sri Lanka.

References

Labdia
Moths described in 1912